The AFC Women's Club Championship is the top-tier women's football club competition in Asia. It involves the top clubs from countries affiliated with the Asian Football Confederation (AFC). Designed as pilot tournaments, the format will change in 2023 to an invitational tournament, and in 2024 replaced with the launch of the AFC Women's Champions League.

The concept of an Asian women's club competition was first recommended in 2018. The inaugural championship in 2019 was held as a round-robin tournament among four teams from the east region. This was followed by the 2021 championship among four teams from the west region. For 2022, seven teams would be split between east and west regions, with winners from the two regions facing off in the final on 22 October 2022.

The current (2022) champions are Thailand's College of Asian Scholars for the East zone title and Uzbekistan's Sogdiyona Jizzak for the West zone title.

Results

Records and statistics

Performances by club

Performances by nation

Performances by regional federations

Top scorers by year

See also
Worldwide
FIFA Women's Club World Cup (FIFA)
Continental
Continental football championships
CAF Women's Champions League (CAF) (Africa)
Copa Libertadores Femenina (CONMEBOL) (South America)
UEFA Women's Champions League (UEFA) (Europe)
Regional
UNCAF Women's Interclub Championship (UNCAF) (Central America)
WAFF Women's Clubs Championship (WAFF) (West Asia)
AFC Men's
AFC Champions League (1st-tier cup)
AFC Cup (2nd-tier cup)

References

External links
, the-AFC.com
AFC Women's Club Championship at the RSSSF

 
Women
Women's association football competitions in Asia
Multi-national professional sports leagues
2019 establishments in Asia
Recurring sporting events established in 2019